Khanpur Legislative Assembly constituency is one of the seventy electoral Uttarakhand Legislative Assembly constituencies of Uttarakhand state in India. It includes Khanpur area of Haridwar District.

Khanpur (Uttarakhand Assembly constituency) is a part of Haridwar (Lok Sabha constituency).

Members of Legislative Assembly

Election results

2022

See also
 Landhaura (Uttarakhand Assembly constituency)

References

External links
  

Haridwar
Assembly constituencies of Uttarakhand
2002 establishments in Uttarakhand
Constituencies established in 2002